Pirjo Hannele Ahonen (née Nieminen, previously Blomqvist; born 5 November 1970) is a Finnish retired ice hockey defenceman and bandy player and a former member of the Finnish women's national ice hockey team and national bandy team. 

In ice hockey, she won a bronze medal with the Finnish national team at the 1999 IIHF Women's World Championship and competed in the women's ice hockey tournament at the 2002 Winter Olympics. Her ice hockey club career was played in the Naisten SM-sarja with KalPa Naiset, Tampereen Ilves Naiset, and JYP Jyväskylä Naiset, which was also known as the Jyväskylän Hockey Cats (JyHC) during her tenure.

Ahonen holds the record for most games played with the Finnish women's national bandy team, appearing in 63 international matches with the team. Having represented Finland at a number of Women's Bandy World Championships, she won bronze medals at the tournaments in 2004, 2008, and 2012. Her bandy club career was played with Jyväskylän Seudun Palloseura (JPS), Botnia-69 Helsinki, Veiterä Lappeenranta, and Mikkelin Kampparit. Ahonen was named the Finnish Women's Bandy Player of the Year by the Finnish Bandy Association three times, in 2005, 2007, and 2012.

References

External links
 
 
 

1970 births
Living people
Finnish bandy players
Finnish women's ice hockey defencemen
Ice hockey players at the 2002 Winter Olympics
Ilves Naiset players
JYP Jyväskylä Naiset players
Jyväskylän Hockey Cats players
KalPa Naiset players
Olympic ice hockey players of Finland
Sportspeople from Jyväskylä